The Dark Secret of Harvest Home is a 1978 American television horror-thriller miniseries,  produced by Universal Television and directed by Leo Penn, that aired January 23–24, 1978 on NBC. The screenplay was based on the 1973 novel Harvest Home by Tom Tryon and is largely faithful to the original material.

Cast
 Bette Davis as Widow Fortune
 David Ackroyd as Nick Constantine 
 Joanna Miles as Beth Constantine
 Rosanna Arquette as Kate Constantine 
 René Auberjonois as Jack Stump 
 John Calvin as Justin Hooke 
 Norman Lloyd as Amys Penrose
 Stephen Joyce as Robert Dodd
 Linda Marsh as Maggie Dodd
 Michael Durrell as Ty Barth
 Steve Gustafson as Jimmy Minerva
 Michael O'Keefe as Worthy Pettinger 
 Grayce Grant as Mrs. Pettinger (Worthy's mother)
 Martin Shakar as David Adwell
 Laurie Prange as Sophie Hooke
 Lina Raymond as Tamar Penrose
 Tracey Gold as Missy Penrose
 Bill Balhatchet and Kathleen Howland as Fred and Asia Minerva

Release
The miniseries originally aired on NBC in 1978, and reran in March 1979.  It was also shown on TNT in 1992, in two parts. This two-parter was the full 3-hour, 48-minute version. It was later broadcast in a slightly truncated version, running just about 3 hours, on the Sci-Fi Channel at some point in the mid-1990s. Many bootleg copies are taken from this source. The Dark Secret of Harvest Home has been released on video; this version is more heavily edited, running only 2 hours long.
 
The chapters to this series are:
Part 1: Ploughing Day, Planting Day, Agnes Fair, Choosing The Young Lord, The Day Of Seasoning
Part 2: Tithing Day, Sheaving Tide, Husking Bee, Corn Play, Kindling Night, Harvest Home

References

External links
 
 The Obscurity Factor : Bette Davis & Rosanna Arquette in The Dark Secret of Harvest Home (1978)

1978 American television series debuts
1970s American television miniseries
Films about neopaganism
Films based on American horror novels
Films directed by Leo Penn
Films scored by Paul Chihara
Folk horror films
NBC network original films
Television shows based on American novels